The Boarding School may refer to:

The Boarding School; or, Lessons of a Preceptress to Her Pupils, 1798 American novel
The Boarding School (film), 1969 Spanish psychological suspense/horror film

See also
Boarding School (disambiguation)
Boarding school, educational institution